The Hostages is an 1896 oil on canvas painting created by French painter and sculptor Jean-Paul Laurens, the last in a series of historical works by him. He does not give a specific historical setting, although he evokes the Princes in the Tower and Richard III of England. It is now collected in the Museum of Fine Arts of Lyon.

References

1896 paintings
French paintings
Paintings of children
Paintings in the collection of the Museum of Fine Arts of Lyon